Vitaliy Anatolyevich Savin (born 23 January 1966) is a former Soviet athlete from Kazakhstan, winner of gold medal in 4 × 100 m relay at the 1988 Summer Olympics.

At the Seoul Olympics, Vitaliy Savin reached the quarterfinal of 100 m and ran the anchoring leg in the Soviet 4 × 100 m relay team, which won the gold medal in absence of United States.

At the 1991 World Championships, Savin was again eliminated in the quarterfinals of 100 m and was seventh in 4 × 100 m. At the 1992 Summer Olympics, Savin was eliminated in the semifinal of 100 m and was fifth as a member of the Unified Team's 4 × 100 m relay team.

Savin reached the quarterfinals of the 100 m at 1993 World Championships and 1995 World Championships. His last major tournament was the 1996 Summer Olympics, where he was eliminated in the heats of 100 m.

Savin's personal best time over 100 m was 10.08 seconds, achieved in Linz on 13 August 1992.

References

External links
 

1966 births
Living people
Soviet male sprinters
Kazakhstani male sprinters
People from Karaganda Region
Olympic athletes of the Soviet Union
Olympic athletes of the Unified Team
Olympic athletes of Kazakhstan
Athletes (track and field) at the 1988 Summer Olympics
Athletes (track and field) at the 1992 Summer Olympics
Athletes (track and field) at the 1996 Summer Olympics
Olympic gold medalists for the Soviet Union
World Athletics Championships athletes for the Soviet Union
World Athletics Championships athletes for Kazakhstan
Athletes (track and field) at the 1994 Asian Games
Asian Games medalists in athletics (track and field)
Honoured Masters of Sport of the USSR
Medalists at the 1988 Summer Olympics
Asian Games silver medalists for Kazakhstan
Olympic gold medalists in athletics (track and field)
Medalists at the 1994 Asian Games
CIS Athletics Championships winners
Soviet Athletics Championships winners
Kazakhstani people of Russian descent